Izabela Monika Bełcik (born 29 November 1980) is a Polish volleyball player, a member of Poland women's national volleyball team in 1999–2014, double European Champion (2003, 2005), bronze medalist of the European Championship 2009, four-time Polish Champion (2008, 2009, 2012, 2013).

Career

Clubs
She went to PGE Atom Trefl Sopot in 2010. On 15 March 2015 she achieved with team from Sopot Polish Cup 2015.

National team
On 28 September 2003 Poland women's national volleyball team, including Bełcik, beat Turkey (3–0) in final and won title of European Champion 2003. Two years later, Polish team with Bełcik in squad defended title and achieved second title of European Champion. In October 2009 she won with teammates bronze medal of European Championship 2009 after winning match against Germany. She took part in 1st edition of European Games. In semi final her national team beat Serbia and qualified to final match. On 27 June 2015 Poland was beaten by Turkey and Bełcik with her teammates achieved silver medal.

Sporting achievements

Clubs

CEV Cup
  2014/2015 - with PGE Atom Trefl Sopot

National championships
 2004/2005  Polish Championship, with Nafta-Gaz Piła
 2005/2006  Polish Championship, with Nafta-Gaz Piła
 2007/2008  Polish Championship, with MKS Muszynianka-Fakro Muszyna
 2008/2009  Polish Championship, with MKS Muszynianka-Fakro Muszyna
 2009/2010  Polish SuperCup 2009, with Bank BPS Muszynianka Fakro Muszyna
 2009/2010  Polish Championship, with Bank BPS Muszynianka Fakro Muszyna
 2010/2011  Polish Championship, with PGE Atom Trefl Sopot
 2011/2012  Polish Championship, with PGE Atom Trefl Sopot
 2012/2013  Polish Championship, with PGE Atom Trefl Sopot
 2013/2014  Polish Championship, with PGE Atom Trefl Sopot
 2014/2015  Polish Cup, with PGE Atom Trefl Sopot

National team
 1997  CEV U18 European Championship
 2003  CEV European Championship
 2005  CEV European Championship
 2009  CEV European Championship
 2015  European Games

Individually
 2013 Polish Cup - Best Server
 2015 Polish Cup - Best Setter

State awards
 2005  Gold Cross of Merit

References

External links
 ORLEN Liga player profile

1980 births
Living people
People from Malbork
Sportspeople from Pomeranian Voivodeship
Polish women's volleyball players
Recipients of the Gold Cross of Merit (Poland)
Volleyball players at the 2015 European Games
European Games medalists in volleyball
European Games silver medalists for Poland